The European Wound Management Association (EWMA) was founded in 1991. 
The association works to promote the advancement of education and research into native epidemiology, pathology, diagnosis, prevention and management of wounds of all aetiologies.

EWMA is an umbrella organisation linking wound management associations across Europe and a multidisciplinary group bringing together individuals and organisations interested in wound management. Currently, the association bridges 46 Cooperating Organisations (national wound care associations in Europe) and, in addition, partners with a considerable number of wound and wound related associations in and outside of Europe. Furthermore, EWMA has a large number of individual members from all over Europe.

EWMA works to reach its objectives by being an educational resource, organising conferences, contributing to international projects related to wound management, actively supporting the implementation of existing knowledge within wound management and providing information on all aspects of wound management.

Objectives
To promote the advancement of education and research into epidemiology, pathology, diagnosis, prevention and management of wounds of all aetiologies.
To arrange conferences on aspects of wound management throughout Europe.
To arrange multi-centre, multi-disciplinary training courses on topical aspects of wound healing.
To create a forum for networking for all individuals and organisations interested in wound management

EWMA Journal

The EWMA Journal is the official journal of the European Wound Management Association (EWMA). Issues are published in January, May and October.

EWMA Journal is CINAHL indexed and provides peer-reviewed original scientific articles, reviews, clinical information, and information about development in wound healing and management across Europe. The Journal also functions as a communication tool between EWMA, its members and the EWMA Cooperating Organisations. It serves as a means of distributing information and details of initiatives across national borders, thus supporting EWMA’s aim of advancing wound healing within Europe. As EWMA shares the vision of an ‘open access’ philosophy, the Journal is freely available online.

It is distributed to EWMA members and to members of national wound healing organisations in Europe, as well as to a wider audience via the internet. As a result, each issue of the EWMA Journal is distributed to 12-13,000 nurses, doctors and other health care professionals who have a special interest in wound care.

External links 
European Wound Management Association website
EWMA Journal

Organizations established in 1991
International medical associations of Europe
1991 establishments in Europe